Snelson is a civil parish in Cheshire East, England.  It contains two buildings that are recorded in the National Heritage List for England as designated listed buildings, both of which are listed at Grade II.  This grade is the lowest of the three gradings given to listed buildings and is applied to "buildings of national importance and special interest".  The parish is entirely rural, its listed buildings consisting of a house and a weir associated with a country house.

References

Citations

Sources

 

Listed buildings in the Borough of Cheshire East
Lists of listed buildings in Cheshire